Michael Bender may refer to:

Michael A. Bender, American computer scientist
Michael C. Bender, American journalist and author
Michael L. Bender (born 1942), American attorney, former Chief Justice of the Colorado Supreme Court

See also
Michael Binder (born 1969), retired Austrian football midfielder